Pseudohadena evanida is a moth of the family Noctuidae. It is found in Central Asia, including Kazakhstan.

The wingspan is 44 mm. The forewings are light yellowish grey.

Subspecies
Pseudohadena evanida evanida
Pseudohadena evanida psammoxantha Ronkay, Varga & Fábián, 1995

References

Moths described in 1914
Xyleninae